Jhonnatan Botero Villegas (born 27 April 1992) is a Colombian mountain bike racer. Among his most important achievements are the team gold medal obtained at the 2010 Singapore Youth Olympic Games and the fifth place in mountain biking at the 2016 Rio de Janeiro Olympic Games.

Sports career

Beginnings

His passion for cycling started at a young age. Botero always went to school by bicycle, in the Antioquia municipality of El Retiro, the town where he was born. Also, when he entered college, he never stopped training before going to class, so he was always in contact with a bicycle.

His beginnings in mountain biking are due in part to his uncle, John Jairo Botero, who, living in Italy, was passionate about this sport.

With the support of his coach, Héctor Pérez, he launched his career towards the Singapore Youth Olympic Games in 2010.

Participation in competitions 

Jhonnatan Botero's sports career is identified by his participation in the following national  and international events:

Youth Olympic Games

He was recognized for his triumph for being Colombia's second gold medalist at the Youth Olympic Games for the Colombian national team at the 2010 Singapore games.

His participation in the first edition of the games was notable for being the second athlete with a gold medal among all the Colombian participants of the event, by obtaining victory over the Italian mountain biking team on August 17.

2016 Rio de Janeiro Olympics

Botero had a great participation in the Mountain Biking of the Olympic Games in Rio de Janeiro, where he took fifth place and gave Colombia its twenty-second Olympic diploma in this sporting competition.

MTB Pan American Championship, Colombia

During this event, held in 2018, Botero won the gold medal in the team relay event, along with the participation of his teammates Valentina Abril and Leydy Mera.

This competition was held in the city of Pereira, Risaralda, where the second place was occupied by the Costa Rican team and the third by Mexico.

MTB Pan American Championship, Puerto Rico

In 2021, Botero participated in the Pan American Mountain Biking (MTB) Championship, held in Salinas (Puerto Rico), obtaining second place, behind Mexican Gerardo Ulloa.

Honors

Olympic Games 
Rio de Janeiro 2016
 5th in Cross-country cycling

Pan American Championships

Guatemala 2010
  Gold in mixed relay
  Gold in Cross-country cycling Junior
San Miguel de Tucumán 2013
  Gold in Cross-country cycling U23
Londrina 2014
  Gold in Cross-country cycling U23
Pereira 2018
  Gold in mixed relay (with Laura Valentina Abril and Leidy Mera)
Salinas 2021
  Silver in Cross-country cycling

Central American and Caribbean Games 
 Barranquilla/Cali 2018
  Silver in Cross-country cycling

Youth Olympic Games 
 Singapur 2010
  Team gold in Cross-country cycling (with Jessica Legarda, Brayan Ramírez  and David Oquendo)

Bolivarian Games 
Santa Marta 2017
  Bronze in Cross-country cycling

Championships in Colombia 
 2014 
  Gold in Cross-country cycling
 2015 
  Gold in Cross-country cycling
 2016 
  Gold in Cross-country cycling
 2018 
  Silver in Cross-country cycling
 2019 
  Silver in Cross-country cycling
 2022 
  Bronze in Cross-country cycling

See also

 Cycling at the 2010 Summer Youth Olympics
 Colombia at the 2010 Summer Youth Olympics
 Colombia at the Youth Olympics
 2010 Summer Youth Olympics

References

External links 

 Mountain Bike - Jhonnatan Botero Villegas (the-sports.org)
 Jhonnatan Botero Villegas (sitiodeciclismo.net) (In Spanish)
  (In Spanish)

1992 births
Living people
Colombian male cyclists
Cyclists at the 2016 Summer Olympics
Olympic cyclists of Colombia
Sportspeople from Antioquia Department
Central American and Caribbean Games silver medalists for Colombia
21st-century Colombian people
Competitors at the 2018 Central American and Caribbean Games